Ghayal: Once Again is a 2016 Indian action drama film  written and directed by Sunny Deol. It is a direct sequel to the 1990 film Ghayal. It is directed, written and headlined by Sunny Deol who again plays Ajay Mehra. The film is produced by Dharmendra and jointly distributed by Reliance Entertainment and PVR Pictures. The film was theatrically released worldwide on 5 February 2016.

Plot
The film follows the events that end Ghayal, with Ajay Mehra surrendering after killing Balwant Rai (who had murdered Ajay's brother) and is sentenced to prison. Upon his release he begins a new career as a reporter for an independent newspaper, but also works as a vigilante who assists the police with their hard-to-prosecute cases (including cases where the accused are prominent and influential members of society). One such case involves small town reporter Renu who was drugged and assaulted by media baron Aditya Rajguru. Renu committed suicide and Rajguru's men covered up the matter, implicating her innocent boyfriend. Ajay swings into action and abducts Rajguru, soon forcibly obtaining his DNA. Rajguru is then arrested and Ajay is declared a sensational hero. However, Ajay still suffers anxiety attacks from his painful memories of his past. His psychiatrist girlfriend Riya helps him with his problems.

Joe D'Souza has retired and is now a social activist. Ajay often collaborates with him and helps him out. Later on, however, D'Souza is killed in a traffic accident in Panvel. A blogger Zoya Saigal is shocked to discover that Joe was, in fact, shot dead. She had accidentally captured the murder on video, committed by Kabir Raj Bansal, son of business mogul Raj Bansal. Zoya and her friends panic and want to take the video to the cops, but Zoya's friend Anushka's grandfather infers that Raj Bansal had staged the road accident (where 8 other innocent people were killed) and stops them, due to Bansal's power. It is further revealed that D'Souza had visited Raj Bansal and directly accused him of illegal land acquisition. Bansal tried to bribe him, but an argument ensues, and Kabir, in a fit of rage, shot D'Souza. The accident was covered up. Bansal realizes that Kabir is still a bratty kid and decides to enrol him into a military school. 

Following her grandfather's advice, Anushka turns 
the video over to their friend Rohan's father lawyer, Kriplani, in order to ensure the children remain safe. However, Kriplani quietly returns it to Bansal and Rohan realizes that his father has given up the video and thus urges Zoya to reach Ajay Mehra. As the children hurry to reach Ajay, they are intercepted by Bansal's thugs. A chase ensues and Ajay saves the children, recovering the video. Riya takes the children to the hospital, but they are yet again abducted by Bansal's men. Ajay finds that Anushka is his own daughter as her grandfather had kept the secret to shield her from Ajay's criminal past. Kabir tortures the children until Bansal, tired of his son's tantrums, warns him away. Bansal holds Anushka and releases the other children. He tells Ajay that his daughter will henceforth stay with Bansal in order to ensure the safety of Kabir. Bansal's mother objects, but Bansal, locked in moral conflict waves her away. Bansal orders the Home Minister to arrest Ajay. Ajay overcomes the cops and mounts an attack on the Bansal mansion to rescue Anushka. After a fierce fight, Ajay rescues Anushka as well as Bansal's family who gets trapped in the debris. Bansal apologizes to Ajay and Anushka where he, along with Kabir surrenders to the police. Ajay and Anushka recover in the hospital surrounded by their friends.

Cast
 Sunny Deol as Ajay Mehra (Anushka's father)
 Soha Ali Khan as Doctor Riya, Ajay Mehra's girlfriend
 Shivam Patil as Rohan Kriplani (Lawyer Kriplani's son)
 Rishabh Arora as Varun / Fattu
 Diana Khan as Zoya Sehgal
 Aanchal Munjal as Anushka Mehra, Ajay Mehra's Daughter & Kulkarni's Granddaughter 
 Om Puri as ACP Joe D'Souza, Ajay's Friend 
 Narendra Jha as Raj Bansal, the main antagonist 
 Manoj Joshi as Home Minister Kaka Saheb, Bansal's Personal Assistant 
 Tisca Chopra as Sheetal Bansal, Raj Bansal's wife
 Yo Yo Honey Singh as Bindu Villain
 Ruhanika Dhawan as Ananya Bansal, Raj and Sheetal's daughter
 Sachin Khedekar as Lawyer Sanjeev Kriplani, Rohan's father
 Ramesh Deo as Kulkarni, Anushka's grandfather and Varsha's Father
 Srijitaa Ghosh as Renu/Rape Victim
 Jiten Mukhi as Varun's Father 
 Hina Rahevar as Varun's Mother 
 Komal Raj as Varun's Sister 
 Farukh Saeed as Zoya's Father 
 Anisha Hinduja as Zoya's Mother 
 Raymon Singh as Rohan's Mother 
 Nadira Babbar as Raj Bansal's mother
 Abhilash Kumar as Kabir Bansal, Raj and Sheetal's son
 Zakir Hussain as Police Commissioner Ashraf Iqbal
 Satyajeet Puri as Al Noor, Ajay's colleague
 Harsh Chhaya as Aditya Rajguru

Meenakshi Seshadri, Raj Babbar, Moushumi Chatterjee, and Amrish Puri appear as Varsha, Ajay Mehra's Elder Brother, Ajay Mehra's Sister in law, and Balwant Rai respectively from Archive Footage from Ghayal

Production

In 2013 producer Dharmendra expressed his interest to work on the sequel to 1990 film Ghayal, and actor Sunny Deol was supposed to direct the movie, with the title Ghayal Once Again.

Soundtrack 

All songs composed by Shankar–Ehsaan–Loy with lyrics by Amitabh Bhattacharya.

Box office
The film had grossed Rs 72.0 million on its first day of release and an estimated Rs 232.5 million by the end of its first weekend, according to film analyst Taran Adarsh.

Sequel
After the success of this film, Sunny Deol expressed his interest to make a third part of this franchise.

References

External links
 
 

2016 films
2010s Hindi-language films
Indian action films
Indian sequel films
Films scored by Shankar–Ehsaan–Loy
Indian vigilante films
Vijayta Films films
Reliance Entertainment films
2016 action films
2010s vigilante films
Hindi-language action films